The team large hill/4 × 5 km competition in Nordic combined at the 2022 Winter Olympics was held on 17 February, at the Kuyangshu Nordic Center and Biathlon Center in Zhangjiakou. Jørgen Graabak, Jens Lurås Oftebro, Espen Bjørnstad, and Espen Andersen, representing Norway, won the event. Germany became the silver medalist, and Japan won the bronze.

The defending champion are Germany, with Norway and Austria being the 2018 silver and bronze medalist, respectively. Only one event of the 2021–22 FIS Nordic Combined World Cup was held before Olympics. Norway won, followed by Germany and Japan. Norway are the 2021 World Champion in Team normal hill/4 × 5 km, with Germany second and Austria third.

The main medal contenders, Norway, Germany, Austria, and Japan, finished the ski jumping close to each other and started the relay within 12 seconds of each other, with Austria going first. The next competitors, France, started one minute and a half behind. At the first exchange, Germany, Austria, and Japan were together, with Norway 5 seconds behind. They skied together the second leg, and in the third leg, Norway has 10 seconds advantage over Austria and Japan and 37 seconds over Germany. In the last leg, Jørgen Graabak increased the advantage to 55 seconds, and Norway finished in the gold medal position. Vinzenz Geiger caught up with Martin Fritz and Ryota Yamamoto, and the silver and bronze medals were decided at the finish line.

Qualification

Results

Ski jumping
The ski jumping part was held at 16:00.

Cross-country
The cross-country part was held at 19:00.

References

Nordic combined at the 2022 Winter Olympics